Mineralnye Vody Airport  (also written as Mineralnyye Vody Airport, to which "Mineralnye Vody" literally translates to Mineral Waters) is an airport in Stavropol Krai, Russia located  west of Mineralnye Vody. It features a civilian terminal area on its west side with 41 parking spots. The airfield houses a Tupolev Tu-154 maintenance facility on the east side.

History
On 22 June 2014, Transaero Airlines began operating the Boeing 747-400 from Moscow. The airline operated the aircraft into the airport during the peak holiday seasons on Sundays, with the aircraft carrying a maximum of 522 passengers. To that date, the 747-400 is the largest aircraft to have operated into the airport.

In July 2016, Novaport bought the Mineralnye Vody Airport from Aeroinvest.

Airlines and destinations

Statistics

Annual traffic

Accidents and incidents 
 On 21 October 1953, Aeroflot Flight 525, a Lisunov Li-2, crashed in bad weather.
 On 31 December 1961, an Aeroflot-Armenia Il-18V crashed while attempting a go-around during a charter flight, killing 32 of 119 on board. The aircraft was one of two sent to pick up people who had been stranded at Tbilisi due to bad weather.
 On 27 February 1972, an Aeroflot Antonov 24B lost control and crashed on approach, after an unintentional application of the thrust reversers.
 On 15 February 1977, Aeroflot Flight 5003 crashed during the initial climb phase of the flight, killing 77 of the 98 people aboard the aircraft.

See also
List of the busiest airports in Russia
List of the busiest airports in Europe
List of the busiest airports in the former USSR

References

External links 

 Official website 

Airports built in the Soviet Union
Airports in Stavropol Krai